Marcelino Nicolás Ñamandú Ojeda  (born 28 July 1999) is a Paraguayan professional footballer who plays as a midfielder for Maldonado.

References

External links
 

1999 births
Living people
Association football midfielders
Paraguayan footballers
Paraguayan Primera División players
Club Rubio Ñu footballers
Cerro Porteño players
Paraguay under-20 international footballers